Barry Geoffrey Downs (24 May 1930 – 5 April 2020) was an Australian sports shooter. He competed in the 50 metre pistol event at the 1968 Summer Olympics. Specifically, he participated in the 25m Rapid Fire Pistol - Men event. Downs died in 2020, aged 89.

References

1930 births
2020 deaths
Australian male sport shooters
Olympic shooters of Australia
Shooters at the 1968 Summer Olympics
Sportsmen from Queensland